Shoplifting 4 Jesus is a 2011 album by British acid-house band, Alabama 3. It was released on 7 November 2011 through Hostage Music Ltd and featured no singles. It was released in the same year as the band's acoustic album, There Will Be Peace...

Recording and touring 
The album was recorded at Jamm Studios, Brixton, in the summer of 2011. Larry Love teamed up with Seggs "Ruts D.C. and uber producer Wizard who replaced Peers Marsh. Larry describes the album as a mixture of provocation, thievery and digital deviance. Marsh (52) left the band in late 2010 for unknown reasons.

Track listing 

 "Have You Been Having a Nightmare?"
 "I Blame Kurt Cobain"
 "We Stole The Moon"
 "It's About That Time"
 "Star Intro"
 "I've Been Seeing Stars (Ain't Seen the Light)"
 "Wrong is Right"
 "Saved"
 "Facebook.con"
 "Black Dog"
 "Summer in the City"
 "Who the Fuck is John Sinclaire?"
 "Let's Go Out 2Nite"
 "Abide With Me"

All songs written by Alabama 3

Personnel 
 Reverend D.Wayne Love – vocals
 Sir 'Eddie' Real – percussion
 Rock Freebase – guitar
 L.B. Dope – drums
 Steve Finnerty – guitar, vocals, keys, production
 Larry Love – vocals
 Aurora Dawn – vocals
 Frank Zappatista – bass, vocals
 The Spirit of Love – keyboards
 Wizard - Co Production, Recording & Mixdown Engineer

Also featuring:
 Sister Tallulah Boo
 Reverend B.Atwell
 Errol T
 Sister Francesca Love
 Rob Walsh (Cold Comfort)

References

External links 
http://www.alabama3.co.uk/

2011 albums
Alabama 3 albums